Libe Goad (born January 28, 1974) is a technology and video game journalist who resides in New York City and has written about video games and gadgets for publications including Blender, PC Magazine, Bust, Seventeen and Sync.

She is currently the Editor-in-Chief of AOL's GameDaily.com  video game Web site and a semi-regular TV talking head on CNBC  and other stations. Formerly, she was a Senior Writer at PCMag.com and Web Editor for Sync magazine for Ziff Davis. She is also the co-founder of GameGal.com, an early influential Web site for girl gamers. Goad is married to Dan Ackerman of CNET Networks, and their joint Web site  is dedicated to their work covering technology, games and gadgets. She also appeared on a web show called "Play Value" Along with her husband and other people in the video gaming industry. The show talked about the history of gaming such as "The Rise of Atari", or "The Death of The Arcade".

Goad was named one of the 50 Most Influential Games Journalists by Next-Generation, and is a judge for both Spike TV's VGA awards  and the E3 Game Critics Awards.

References

External links
GameDaily.com

1974 births
Living people
American women journalists
21st-century American women